St Helens Junction railway station is a railway station serving St Helens, Merseyside, England. It is in Sutton, three miles southeast of St Helens town centre. The station and all trains calling there are presently operated by Northern Trains.

History
St Helens Junction station was opened in 1830 as part of the Liverpool and Manchester Railway, and is one of the oldest passenger railway stations in the world. These early intermediate stations were often little more than halts, usually positioned where the railway was crossed by a road or turnpike. This probably accounts for variations in the names of these stopping places, St Helens Junction station was probably originally known as Bottom of Sutton Incline becoming St Helens Junction sometime in 1832 or 1833. Although a local historian puts the opening date as later. The OS 6 inch map surveyed in 1846-47 has the station named as St. Helens station.

The station was situated to the south of Sutton just after the Manchester facing connecting line from the St Helens and Runcorn Gap Railway, hence it being called Junction. The main line of the St Helens and Runcorn Gap Railway crossed the Liverpool and Manchester Railway on an overbridge shortly before the junction and station. That route, which ran originally from the town of St Helens to the area which would later develop into the town of Widnes, opened on 21 February 1833 making this station the focal point of one of the first inter-company junctions.
 
The station originally had four platforms - two through lines and two bay platforms on the northern and southern sides of the main building which mostly dealt with local services (this is now part of the station roadway approach and car park arrangements). Several walkway bridges have been constructed and demolished since the station opened in 1833. The Georgian buildings on the south facing platforms were demolished in the early 1960s and a small open waiting shelter built in their place.

To the west of the station on the south side of the line stood the London and North Western Railway tarpaulin factory, known locally as 'the sheeting sheds', access from Monastery Lane being provided by a footbridge known as 'the pudding bag bridge', a favourite location of trainspotters in the 1950s as the steam engines of westbound trains were being fired to climb the Sutton bank with its 2.5 km of 1 in 90 gradient. 
The station building was listed as a Grade II listed building on 14 October 2016. The reasons given were: its historic interest, representing a second generation of station buildings; its Classical design; its degree of survival, being relatively unaltered; and its group value with other listed buildings on the line.

The lines through the station were due to be electrified by December 2014 but the work was finally completed in early March 2015, 3 months behind schedule.

In 2013, concern was expressed that parking space at the station was inadequate. In August 2017, Merseytravel announced that a new car park would be built at the station, increasing the number of parking spaces from 66 to 240. The £792,000 package of works would also see improvements to the CCTV coverage and lighting and the creation of additional blue-badge parking spaces. The extension was completed and opened on 14 May 2018.

Facilities
The station is staffed throughout the day (including Sundays), with the ticket office (on the eastbound-platform) open from 15 minutes before start of service until 23:50 each evening. There are shelters on each platform, along with customer help points, timetable poster boards and digital display screens to provide train running information. Step-free access is available to both platforms, though that for the westbound one requires staff assistance (as it is via a steep ramp and locked gate). The two platforms are also linked by footbridge. There is car parking for 240 vehicles.

Services
On Monday to Saturday daytimes, there are two trains per hour in each direction. Services to Manchester Victoria only operate in peak periods since the May 2018 timetable change, whilst there is also a single evening peak hour train to  via Earlestown.

Electrification has seen the introduction of 4-Car Class 319 electric multiple units (EMUs) and 3-car Class 323, it also sees the occasional Class 331 and an occasional Class 156 EMUs on the Manchester Airport, Manchester Victoria and Warrington Bank Quay services.

Sundays see an hourly service in each direction to Liverpool and to Manchester Piccadilly & Manchester Airport but no direct service to Manchester Victoria or Warrington (connections can be made at Earlestown or Newton-le-Willows).

See also

 Listed buildings in St Helens, Merseyside
 St Helens Central railway station

References

External links

{

Railway stations in St Helens, Merseyside
DfT Category E stations
Former London and North Western Railway stations
Railway stations in Great Britain opened in 1830
Northern franchise railway stations
1830 establishments in England